Cynodictis, ("slender dog marten") is an extinct amphicyonid carnivoran which inhabited Eurasia from the Late Eocene subepoch to the Early Oligocene subepoch living from 37.2—28.4 million years ago, existing for approximately .

Anatomy
Cynodictis had a long muzzle and a low-slung body. It had carnassial teeth for slicing chunks of meat off carcasses. It was about 30 cm at the shoulder.

Fossil distribution
Fossil specimens have been found in the Lushi Formation of Mengjiapo, China, in Weisserburg, Germany and Les Saleres in the Ager Basin of Spain, the Bembridge Limestone and Bembridge Marls Formations of the Isle of Wight, Great Britain as well as the Perrière and Quercy Phosphorites Formations and La Débruge in France.

References

Further reading 
 Haines, Tim, and Paul Chambers. The Complete Guide to Prehistoric Life. Pg. 176. Canada: Firefly Books Ltd., 2006

Bear dogs
Eocene carnivorans
Oligocene caniforms
Priabonian life
Rupelian life
Oligocene mammals of Europe
Eocene mammals of Europe
Paleogene England
Fossils of England
Paleogene France
Fossils of France
Quercy Phosphorites Formation
Paleogene Germany
Fossils of Germany
Eocene mammals of Asia
Paleogene China
Fossils of China
Paleontology in Henan
Fossil taxa described in 1850
Prehistoric carnivoran genera